Grant County is a county in the U.S. state of Minnesota. As of the 2020 census, the population was 6,074. Its county seat is Elbow Lake.

History
The county was created on March 6, 1868. It was named for Civil War General and US President Ulysses S. Grant. Its government was organized in 1874.

Geography
The Chippewa River flows generally southward through the eastern part of Grant County. The Mustinka River flows south and then west-southwest through the upper and central parts of western Grant County. The terrain consists of low rolling hills dotted with lakes, its usable areas devoted to agriculture. The terrain generally slopes to the south and east; its highest point is on its upper eastern border, at 1,375' (409m) ASL.

Major highways

  Interstate 94
  U.S. Highway 52
  U.S. Highway 59
  Minnesota State Highway 9
  Minnesota State Highway 27
  Minnesota State Highway 55
  Minnesota State Highway 78
  Minnesota State Highway 79

Adjacent counties

 Otter Tail County - north
 Douglas County - east
 Pope County - southeast
 Stevens County - south
 Traverse County - southwest
 Wilkin County - northwest

Protected areas

 Alvstad State Wildlife Management Area
 Berksow State Wildlife Management Area
 Chippewa State Wildlife Management Area
 Helsene State Wildlife Management Area
 Isaacson State Wildlife Management Area
 Kube-Swift State Wildlife Management Area
 Malsville State Wildlife Management Area
 Marple State Wildlife Management Area
 Mustinka State Wildlife Management Area
 Storm-Bordson State Wildlife Management Area
 Wilts State Wildlife Management Area

Demographics

2000 census
As of the 2000 census, there were 6,289 people, 2,534 households, and 1,740 families in the county. The population density was 11.6/sqmi (4.50/km2). There were 3,098 housing units at an average density of 5.74/sqmi (2.22/km2).  The racial makeup of the county was 98.28% White, 0.21% Black or African American, 0.27% Native American, 0.19% Asian, 0.30% from other races, and 0.75% from two or more races. 0.52% of the population were Hispanic or Latino of any race. 41.2% were of Norwegian, 30.0% German and 7.4% Swedish ancestry.

There were 2,534 households, out of which 29.20% had children under the age of 18 living with them, 59.00% were married couples living together, 6.50% had a female householder with no husband present, and 31.30% were non-families. 28.00% of all households were made up of individuals, and 16.50% had someone living alone who was 65 years of age or older. The average household size was 2.40 and the average family size was 2.94.

The county population contained 23.90% under the age of 18, 6.90% from 18 to 24, 23.10% from 25 to 44, 23.20% from 45 to 64, and 22.90% who were 65 years of age or older. The median age was 42 years. For every 100 females there were 94.50 males. For every 100 females age 18 and over, there were 94.30 males.

The median income for a household in the county was $33,775, and the median income for a family was $42,214. Males had a median income of $28,428 versus $20,240 for females. The per capita income for the county was $17,131.  About 6.00% of families and 8.40% of the population were below the poverty line, including 9.50% of those under age 18 and 9.90% of those age 65 or over.

2020 Census

Communities

Cities

 Ashby
 Barrett
 Elbow Lake (county seat)
 Herman
 Hoffman
 Norcross
 Wendell

Unincorporated communities
 Charlesville (partial)
 Erdahl

Ghost towns
 Hereford
 Pomme de Terre
 Thorsborg

Townships

 Delaware Township
 Elbow Lake Township
 Elk Lake Township
 Erdahl Township
 Gorton Township
 Land Township
 Lawrence Township
 Lien Township
 Logan Township
 Macsville Township
 North Ottawa Township
 Pelican Lake Township
 Pomme de Terre Township
 Roseville Township
 Sanford Township
 Stony Brook Township

Government and politics
Grant County is a swing district that has leaned Republican in recent elections. As of 2016, the county has selected the Republican presidential candidate in 60% of national elections from 1980 inclusive.

See also
 National Register of Historic Places listings in Grant County, Minnesota

References

External links
 Grant County Website

 
Minnesota counties
1874 establishments in Minnesota
Populated places established in 1874